5th arrondissement may refer to:
France
 5th arrondissement of Lyon
 5th arrondissement of Marseille
 5th arrondissement of Paris
Benin
 5th arrondissement of Porto-Novo
 5th arrondissement of the Littoral Department

Arrondissement name disambiguation pages